Jean-Hugues Dieudonné Colonna (born 31 May 1934) is a French Socialist Party politician.

Born in Cargèse, Corse-du-Sud, Colonna moved to Nice in the 1970s to be a teacher of physical education. He served in the National Assembly representing Alpes-Maritimes's 3rd constituency (1981–1986) and Alpes-Maritimes at large (1986–1988). While in the Assembly, he was an advisor on Corsican affairs for Gaston Defferre, the Minister of the Interior. In 1988, he was defeated in the run-off for the 5th constituency of the department by Christian Estrosi. He was made a Chevalier of the Legion of Honour in April 1998 for "34 years of civil and military service, trade union activities and elected public service".

He married Cécile Riou, who was originally from Brittany. Their son Yvan Colonna was a Corsican nationalist who was convicted of the murder of prefect Claude Érignac in 1998 and was himself murdered in prison in 2022.

References

1934 births
Living people
People from Corse-du-Sud
Corsican politicians
People from Nice
Socialist Party (France) politicians
Deputies of the 7th National Assembly of the French Fifth Republic
Deputies of the 8th National Assembly of the French Fifth Republic